James Michael "Jim" Ferguson  (born April 27, 1949) is a retired water polo player from the United States. He played on UCLA's team from 1968 to 1970 which included the undefeated 1969 team in which he received All-American honors. He was born in Kokomo, Indiana.

In the 1972 Summer Olympics in Munich, West Germany, Ferguson was co-captain of the USA Team that won a bronze medal. In 1973 Ferguson was selected to the All World Team.  An outstanding competitor, Ferguson was inducted into the USA Water Polo Hall of Fame in 1984, to the International Water Polo Hall of Fame in 1992, and was inducted into UCLA's Athletic Hall of Fame in October 2007. In October 2015, Ferguson was named to the Pac-12 All Century Team as a Driver/Attacker along with one other UCLA player.

See also
 List of Olympic medalists in water polo (men)

References

External links
 

1949 births
Living people
American male water polo players
Water polo players at the 1972 Summer Olympics
Olympic bronze medalists for the United States in water polo
Place of birth missing (living people)
UCLA Bruins men's water polo players
Medalists at the 1972 Summer Olympics